Qayqu (Quechua for a type of hunt, also spelled Ccaycco, Ocaycco) is a  mountain in the Andes of southern Peru. It is located in the Moquegua Region, General Sánchez Cerro Province, Ichuña District. It lies northwest of Ch'iyar Jaqhi.

References

Mountains of Moquegua Region
Mountains of Peru